Sir Richard Cox, 2nd Baronet (1702–1766) was an Irish baronet.

He was born on 23 November 1702, the grandson of lawyer and judge, Sir Richard Cox, 1st Baronet; and educated at Oxford University. He was Sheriff of Cork City in 1742. Sir Richard Cox (1702-1766)  was the son of Richard Cox (1677-1725) and Susanna French, (died 1716). He married Catherine, daughter of George Evans. The son of Sir Richard Cox (1702-1766) was  Sir Michael Cox, 3rd Baronet who was Archdeacon of Cashel from 1767 to 1772.

References 

1702 births
1766 deaths
Baronets in the Baronetage of Ireland
Sheriffs of Cork (city)